This list identifies a range of parenting issues that affecting separated and divorced parents, that is regarding their children:
Child custody
Joint custody
Child support through the Child Support Agency (UK or (Australia or local equivalent) or through a family court
Contact (including Visitation)
Childrens centre
Enforcement of court orders
Housing issues
Naming the child, change of surname
Parenting plan
Parental responsibility
Passports
Religious issues
Reporting to third parties (NSPCC, Social Services, etc.)
Schools and medical issues
Residence in English law
Residence versus Contact
Shared parenting and shared residency in English law

Critical issues
Child abduction
Child abuse
Legitimacy
Parental alienation
Paternity

See also
CAFCASS
Divorce and related conflict
Family law and Family court
Fathers' rights
Elian Gonzalez
Marriage and related conflict

Divorce
Parenting-related lists
Family law